Chelsea Harbour Pier is a pier on the River Thames, in London, United Kingdom. It is located on the North Bank of the Thames, in the Sands End area of Fulham. The pier serves the redeveloped Chelsea Harbour, a former commercial wharf which has been converted to luxury residential use.

Services
The pier is served by boats operated by Thames Clippers, under contract from London River Services. Services operate between Putney Pier and Blackfriars Millennium Pier in central London.

Interchange
The pier is located approximately 200 metres from Imperial Wharf railway station on the West London Line. Rail services provided by London Overground and Southern offer direct connections to stations in North London and beyond.

External links
Chelsea Harbour Pier - Transport for London
Chelsea Harbour Pier - Uber Boat by Thames Clippers

References

Buildings and structures in the London Borough of Hammersmith and Fulham
History of the London Borough of Hammersmith and Fulham
London River Services
Transport in the London Borough of Hammersmith and Fulham
Fulham